Princess Brun Njua (born 26 January 1986) is a multi award-winning Cameroonian actress and Model. She came to prominence back in 2014 after appearing on the popular ITV TV series Judge Rinder. She is the recipient of a BEFFTA star award which she won back in 2016.

Early life
Brun Njua (also known as Brunhilda Njua) was born on 26 January 1986 in Kom, which is in the Northwest Region of Cameroon. Brun lost both parents in a motor accident at the age of 14 years of age and had to fend for herself.

Personal life
Brun is the last of ten children.

Career
At 13, Brun started acting in Church Plays. Her first television appearance was on the ITV TV series Judge Rinder.

Filmography

Awards and nominations

References

External links 
 

Nigerian stage actresses
Nigerian film actresses
Living people
1986 births